Gustav "Guus" Schilling (born 8 February 1876 in Amsterdam – 16 January 1951 in Amsterdam) was a Dutch male track cyclist. He was a professional cyclist between 1898 and 1916. He won the bronze medal in the sprint event at the 1901 UCI Track Cycling World Championships in Berlin, Germany.

References

External links
 

1876 births
1951 deaths
Dutch male cyclists
Dutch cyclists at the UCI Track Cycling World Championships
Cyclists from Amsterdam